Amerila catinca is a moth of the subfamily Arctiinae. It was described by Christoph L. Häuser and Michael Boppré in 1997. It is found in Kenya and Tanzania.

References

Moths described in 1997
Amerilini
Moths of Africa